Coahoma Early College High School (CECHS), formerly Coahoma Agricultural High School (CAHS), is a public secondary school in unincorporated Coahoma County, Mississippi (United States), with a Clarksdale postal address. The school is designated as a part of the Coahoma Agricultural High School District (ASD #1402), and operated by Coahoma Community College. Previously it was, as of 2000, one of three independently functioning agricultural high schools in the state of Mississippi. The school has its own facilities, instructional and administrative personnel, and student programs. It shares library facilities with the college.

When it was still CAHS, the school operated the Coahoma Early College High School program. On July 1, 2018, the original Coahoma County Agricultural High School was dissolved, with the Coahoma Early College High School taking its place.

History
Coahoma County Agricultural High School was established in 1924. It was one of the first agricultural high schools for Blacks in Mississippi. A junior college curriculum was added in 1949 and the institution's name was changed to Coahoma Junior College and Agricultural High School. The school was desegregated in 1965, although the student body has remained mostly and in recent years, exclusively African American.

Coahoma Junior College was removed from the title of Coahoma County Agricultural High School in 1975 and in 1981, the school began operating separately from the Coahoma County School District and dropped the word "county" from its name.

A 2012 report by Augenblick, Palaich and Associates suggested changing the school's focus to an early college school and/or merging it. It stated that the school's academic performance was below the state average and that the school no longer had a focus on agriculture.

On July 1, 2018, the original Coahoma County Agricultural High School was dissolved, with the Coahoma Early College High School taking its place. Governor of Mississippi Phil Bryant signed into law Senate Bill 2501, which required this change in the school, in May 2016.

Demographics
A majority of the Coahoma AHS student body comes from the towns of Friars Point, Coahoma, Lula, and Jonestown – all part of the Coahoma County School District. A limited number of students from the Clarksdale Municipal School District opt to attend Coahoma AHS instead of Clarksdale High School.

In the 201415 school year, the school enrolled 267 black students, 1 Hispanic, and no white students.

Structure
The president of Coahoma Community College also serves as superintendent of the Coahoma Agricultural High School. The same board of trustees governs both the high school and community college.

In addition to the superintendent and board of trustees, Coahoma AHS has the same administrative personnel common in other public high schools, including a principal and assistant principal.

Leadership

Superintendents

Principals

Demographics

200607 school year
There was a total of 291 students enrolled at Coahoma Agricultural High School during the 20062007 school year. The gender makeup of the school was 53% female and 47% male. The racial makeup of the school was 100.00% African American. 93.5% of the school's students were eligible to receive free lunch.

Previous school years

Accountability statistics

Notable alumni
 Aaron Henry, civil rights leader

See also

Forrest County Agricultural High School - The sole remaining independently functioning agricultural high school in Mississippi
Hinds County Agricultural High School - One of three remaining independent agricultural high schools in the state until its 2014 closure
List of high schools in Mississippi
List of school districts in Mississippi

References

External links
Coahoma Early College High School – Official site.
Coahoma Community College – Official site.

Public high schools in Mississippi
Schools in Coahoma County, Mississippi
Educational institutions established in 1924
Agricultural schools
1924 establishments in Mississippi